Thersistrombus is a genus of sea snails, marine gastropod mollusks in the family Strombidae, the true conchs.

Species
Species within the genus Thersistrombus include:
Thersistrombus thersites (Swainson, 1823)

References

Strombidae
Monotypic gastropod genera